Phillips Brooks (December 13, 1835January 23, 1893) was an American Episcopal clergyman and author, long the Rector of Boston's Trinity Church and briefly Bishop of Massachusetts. He wrote the lyrics of the Christmas hymn, "O Little Town of Bethlehem".

He is honored on the Episcopal Church liturgical calendar on January 23.

Background

Early life and education
Born in Boston, Brooks was descended through his father, William Gray Brooks, from the Rev. John Cotton; through his mother, Mary Ann Phillips, he was a great-grandson of Samuel Phillips, Jr., founder of Phillips Academy (Andover, Massachusetts). Three of Brooks' five brothersFrederic, Arthur and John Cottonwere eventually ordained in the Episcopal Church.

Phillips Brooks prepared for college at the Boston Latin School and graduated from Harvard University in 1855 at the age of 20, where he was elected to the A.D. Club. He worked briefly as a school teacher at Boston Latin, but, upon being fired, felt that he had failed miserably. He wrote, "I do not know what will become of me and I do not care much.… I wish I were fifteen years old again. I believe I might become a stunning man: but somehow or other I do not seem in the way to come to much now." In 1856 he began to study for ordination in the Episcopal Church in the Virginia Theological Seminary at Alexandria, Virginia.  While a seminarian there, he preached at Sharon Chapel (now All Saints Episcopal Church, Sharon Chapel) in nearby Fairfax County.

Pastoral career

In 1859 he graduated from Virginia Theological Seminary, was ordained deacon by Bishop William Meade of Virginia, and became rector of the Church of the Advent, Philadelphia. In 1860 he was ordained priest, and in 1862 became rector of the Church of the Holy Trinity, Philadelphia, where he remained seven years, gaining an increasing name as Broad churchman, preacher, and patriot. In addition to his moral stature, he was a man of great physical bearing as well, standing six feet four inches tall.

During the American Civil War he upheld the cause of the North and opposed slavery, and his sermon on the death of Abraham Lincoln was an eloquent expression of the character of both men.  His sermon at Harvard's commemoration of the Civil War dead in 1865 likewise attracted attention nationwide.  In 1869 he became rector of Trinity Church, Boston; today, his statue is located on the left exterior of the church.

Brooks wrote that his only ambition was "to be a parish priest and, though not much of one, [I] would as a college president be still less". Under his inspiration, architect Henry Hobson Richardson, muralist John LaFarge, and stained glass artists William Morris and Edward Burne-Jones created an architectural masterpiece in Trinity Church, Boston, among the notable features of which was the first freestanding liturgical altar in the United States in an overall chancel design that attracted attention for its Liturgical Movement influence even in British architectural magazines. Behind the free standing altar there was another revival from the early church chancel, a great synthronon for priests which surrounded the apse. Because Massachusetts had two bishops then, the bishops' chairs were placed within the altar rail to either side of the holy table. There were no choir stalls to distract from the central altar, which was hardly recognized as an altar in a period when most altars were backed up to elaborate carved screens. Until 1888, there was also no pulpit. Brooks preferred to preach his legendary sermons from a modest lectern near the rector's stall on the south side of the chancel. There was also an eagle lectern on a balustraded ambo in the center at the chancel steps.

Such was the magnificence of Trinity Church that, in his chapter on Phillips Brooks' chancel in Ralph Adams Cram: An Architect's Four Quests, Douglass Shand-Tucci calls it "an American Hagia Sophia", a reflection of Brooks' architectural and liturgical tastes, disclosed in his travel writings, where in Germany for instance he referred to "thrilling music" and "thrilling incense" in respect to a liturgy he attended there in the Roman Catholic cathedral. Holy Week in Rome also greatly moved him, especially the papal high mass on Easter. Although he despaired of Anglo-Catholic ritualism, he championed many aspects of the liturgical movement including congregational singing at the liturgy. At the Eucharist, for instance, he would preach, not from the pulpit, but from the chancel steps, and although he liked to preach in a black academic gown he never failed to appear in a commodious white surplice and priest's stole when he officiated at the office or Eucharist.

In 1877 the building of Trinity was completed, but the Venetian mosaics Brooks and Richardson wanted they could not then afford. It was not until the magnificent new altar and sanctuary of Maginnis & Walsh were completed in 1938 that Trinity's chancel reflected that aspect of their dreams for Trinity, which Brooks called "America's glory forever". Here Phillips Brooks preached Sunday after Sunday to great congregations, until he was consecrated Bishop of Massachusetts in 1891. In 1886, he had declined an election as assistant bishop of Pennsylvania. He was for many years an overseer and preacher of Harvard University. In 1881 he declined an invitation to be the sole preacher to the university and professor of Christian ethics. On April 30, 1891 he was elected sixth Bishop of Massachusetts, and on the 14 October was consecrated to that office in Trinity Church.

He died unmarried in 1893, after an episcopate of only 15 months. His death was a major event in the history of Boston. One observer reported: "They buried him like a king. Harvard students carried his body on their shoulders. All barriers of denomination were down. Roman Catholics and Unitarians felt that a great man had fallen in Israel."

Influence and legacy

Publications

In 1877 Brooks published a course of lectures upon preaching, which he had delivered at the theological school of Yale University, and which are an expression of his own experience. In 1879 appeared the Bohlen Lectures on The Influence of Jesus. In 1878 he published his first volume of sermons, and from time to time issued other volumes, including Sermons Preached in English Churches (1883) and "The Candle of the Lord" and Other Sermons (1895).
Brooks was also famous and beloved for his collections of sermons, The Purpose and Use of Comfort, first published in 1878, which includes the title sermon as well as: "The Withheld Completions of Life," "The Conqueror from Edom," "Keeping the Faith," "The Soul's Refuge in God," "The Man with One Talent," "The Food of Man, "The Symbol and the Reality," "Is It I?" and more.

Today, he is probably best known for authoring the Christmas carol "O Little Town of Bethlehem". Brooks also introduced Helen Keller to Christianity and to Anne Sullivan.

Awards and historical monuments

Brooks's understanding of individuals and of other religious traditions gained a following across a broad segment of society, as well as increased support for the Episcopal Church. Within his lifetime, he received honorary degrees from Harvard (1877) and Columbia (1887), and the Doctor of Divinity degree by the University of Oxford, England (1885).

In addition, Brooks's close ties with Harvard University led to the creation of Phillips Brooks House in Harvard Yard, built 7 years after his death. On January 23, 1900, it was dedicated to serve "the ideal of piety, charity, and hospitality."  The Phillips Brooks House originally housed a Social Service Committee, which became the Phillips Brooks House Association in 1904. It ceased formal religious affiliation in the 1920s, but to this day remains in operation as a student-run group of volunteer organizations. Brooks' theological alma mater, Virginia Theological Seminary, honors him with a statue outside its library.

A statue of Phillips Brooks stands on the North Andover, Massachusetts Town Common, facing North Parish Church.

Rev. A.V.G. Allen, an Episcopal clergyman and professor of ecclesiastical history at the Episcopal Divinity School in Cambridge, Massachusetts, published several biographical works on Brooks. These included the two-volume Phillips Brooks, Life and Letters (1901); and the abbreviated and revised one-volume Phillips Brooks (1907), both published in New York. In 1961, Raymond W. Albright published another biography of Brooks entitled Focus on Infinity. His contemporary biographer is Douglass Shand-Tucci, who published a chapter on the bishop in Ralph Adams Cram: an Architects Four Quests in 2005, and in 2009 on the website of Back Bay Historical/The Global Boston Perspective and elaborated as "The Saint Bishop and the American Hagia Sophia", an October 2009 lecture at the New England Historical Genealogical Society in Boston as part of "The Gods of Copley Square" series. Another contemporary biographer, examining the preacher's evangelical legacy, is Gillis J. Harp.  Gillis Harp has now written a major study, "Brahmin Prophet : Phillips Brooks and the Path of Liberal Protestantism".

A private elementary school in Menlo Park, CAPhillips Brooks Schoolis named for Phillips Brooks, as is Brooks School in his hometown of North Andover, Massachusetts, the latter founded by Endicott Peabody, who also founded the Groton School. The Brooks family founded a Brooks Memorial School in Cleveland, Ohio, in 1874 in memory of Phillips' brother, the Rev. Frederic Brooks, who died in an accident in Cambridge. That school was sponsored in part by John D. Rockefeller and operated under the Brooks name until 1891 and exists to this day under the name of the Hathaway Brown School. John S. White, first headmaster of the school in Cleveland, also founded a Phillips Brooks School in Philadelphia in 1904 that operated there until 1919.

The Episcopal Church remembers Phillips Brooks annually on January 23, the anniversary of his death. He is buried in Mount Auburn Cemetery in Cambridge, Massachusetts.

Notes

 Raymond W. Albright, Focus on Infinity: A Life of Philips Brooks (New York, 1961).

References

External links

 Texts and bibliography of works by and about Brooks
 
 
"The Light of the World and Other Sermons." (E. P. Dutton, 1904).
 

1835 births
1893 deaths
Abolitionists from Boston
Anglican saints
History of Christianity in the United States
Clergy from Boston
Harvard University alumni
19th-century Christian saints
19th-century American writers
Episcopal bishops of Massachusetts
American people of English descent
Phillips family (New England)
Burials at Mount Auburn Cemetery
Boston Latin School alumni
Songwriters from Massachusetts
Hall of Fame for Great Americans inductees
19th-century American musicians
Christian abolitionists
19th-century Anglican theologians